Darbid Haft Cheshmeh-e Sofla (also Romanized as Dārbīd Haft Cheshmeh-e Soflá; also known as Dārbīd-e Soflá) is a village in Kakavand-e Sharqi Rural District, Kakavand District, Delfan County, Lorestan Province, Iran. At the 2006 census, its population was 69, in 13 families.

References 

Towns and villages in Delfan County